Osita B. Izunaso (born 30 October 1966) was elected Senator for the Imo West (Orlu) constituency of Imo State, Nigeria, taking office in June 2007. He is a member of the All Progressive Congress (APC).

Izunaso obtained a BA (Hons) from the University of Jos (1989), a post-graduate degree in journalism from the University of Abuja (1998) and an MBA from the University of Calabar (2002).
He was elected to the House of Representatives in 1992 and again in 1999, and was appointed Chief Press Secretary to the Speaker and Senate President. He was Chief Press Secretary to the Minister of Youth and Sports (1995–1997) and was Minister of Labour & Productivity (1998–1999).

After taking his seat in the Senate he was appointed to committees on Rules & Business, Local and Foreign Debts, Housing, Gas, Foreign Affairs and Sports.
In a mid-term evaluation of Senators in May 2009, ThisDay noted that he had sponsored bills for the Conveyance of Persons in Articulated Vehicles Bill, Treatment and Care of Victims of Conflict, National Agency for the Promotion and Preservation of Local Languages in Nigeria and Amendment of the Oil Pipelines Act Amendment. He contributed to plenary debates and was active in committees.
As Chairman of the Committee on Gas he was responsible for a controversial investigation into an alleged huge increase in the contract sum of the Escravos GTL project from $1.7 billion to $5.9 billion.

Early in 2009 there were moves to recall Izunaso, with a petition submitted by people of the Orlu Senatorial District of Imo state to the Independent National Electoral Commission (INEC). 
Deputy Senate President Ike Ekweremadu dismissed the threats as baseless, pointing to the excellent work the Senator had done for the people of the state.
Both Izunaso and Ekweremadu were part of a lobby group opposed to dismissal of INEC chairman Professor Maurice Iwu despite the many problems of the 2007 elections.
Izunaso's support for Imo may have been because Imo was responsible for conduct of the referendum on Izunaso's recall.

References

Living people
1966 births
Imo State
Peoples Democratic Party members of the Senate (Nigeria)
University of Jos alumni
University of Abuja alumni
University of Calabar alumni
21st-century Nigerian politicians